Paul Romanuk (born October 31, 1961) is a Toronto sportscaster and writer. He was born in Oshawa, Ontario, Canada.

Romanuk did television play-by-play for the Toronto Maple Leafs and the NHL on Sportsnet.

Early life
Raised in Oshawa, Romanuk grew up a hockey fan, playing road hockey and watching Hockey Night in Canada. He would simultaneously develop a fondness for sportscasting by watching hockey games called by HNIC'''s play-by-play announcer Danny Gallivan. Furthermore, the youngster also followed Bill Hewitt's announcing work as well as Dan Kelly's whose broadcasts he listened to on KMOX out of St. Louis.

Despite growing up  from Toronto, in the 1970s, young Romanuk became a fan of the Montreal Canadiens whom he took a liking to by watching CBC's Peterborough-based CHEX-TV channel 12 affiliate, which usually carried HNIC`s national feed that often featured Canadiens games called by his broadcasting hero Gallivan, alongside colour commentator Dick Irvin Jr., while, in contrast, CBLT-TV channel 6, the CBC's flagship station in Toronto, carried Toronto Maple Leafs games called by Bill Hewitt and Brian McFarlane. Stating to have been "as much in love with Gallivan as I was with the Habs", Romanuk considers the broadcaster to be as much a part of the 1970s Canadiens as their star players Guy Lafleur, Steve Shutt, Ken Dryden, Serge Savard, etc.

In 1981, Romanuk moved to Toronto in order to study at Ryerson Polytechnical Institute's radio and television arts program.

Career
Early years
From 1981 until 1984, in parallel with attending classes at Ryerson, Romanuk did unpaid work on Toronto Marlboros Sunday broadcasts on CKLN-FM, Ryerson's campus radio station. He began as a stats and technical equipment associate for play-by-play announcer Michael Landsberg before taking over the play-by-play duties following Landsberg's departure.

In 1983, Romanuk, still a student at Ryerson, got his first paid job in broadcasting, getting hired to provide radio colour commentary for the Ontario Hockey League's  Oshawa Generals on CKAR alongside play-by-play man Mike Inglis. By 1984, Inglis moved on and Romanuk took over the play-by-play duties. He continued on the job even after graduating, performing it until 1987.

Early freelance work
Upon graduating from Ryerson in 1984, in addition to continuing as the radio voice of the Ontario Hockey League's Oshawa Generals, Romanuk added a few more freelance gigs.

First on Hockey Night in Canada as stats assistant and runner for the CBC Sports on-air hockey personnel—play-by-play announcer Bob Cole, colour commentator Harry Neale, and studio host Dave Hodge—a job he did until 1987. While working behind the scenes at HNIC, on March 14, 1987, Romanuk was among the first hand witnesses of Dave Hodge's pen flip, an incident where the host—irritated over the network's insistence on cutting to local news at 11 pm rather than sticking with coverage of an exciting conclusion to Canadiens vs. Flyers game that had been headed into overtime—criticized the CBC live on air while signing off to throw to local news.

Additionally, fresh graduate Romanuk freelanced for the new all-sports cable channel TSN, starting there as a newsroom editorial assistant in February 1985, months after the channel's September 1984 launch. Aside from working in the fledgling network's newsroom, he soon got the opportunity to contribute field pieces and file on-camera reports, even doing the occasional update on TSN's central nightly sports newscast SportsDesk.

With his television profile raised as a result of the TSN on-camera appearances, Romanuk got hired to host the OHL Game of the Week presentation during the 1986–87 season on Global Television Network. This further television exposure led to Calgary's CFAC-TV station (at the time still nominally unaffiliated though increasingly reliant on Global's programming) offering him C$50,000, an amount Romanuk in a later interview described as "more money than I had been making from all my freelance gigs put together", for a full-time job of reporting and anchoring their Newsfirst news show. The 25-year-old took the generous offer, bringing his girlfriend along across the country in 1987. However, mere months after moving to Calgary, Romanuk received a full-time reporter position offer for TSN's SportsDesk back in Toronto and decided to take it to the displeasure of his Calgary employers.

TSN
In October 1987, Romanuk began at TSN as a full-time commentator and reporter.

NHL and IIHF play-by-play
He did National Hockey League play-by-play for the NHL on TSN from 1989 until 2001.  Prior to 1994, Romanuk was the secondary TSN hockey play-by-play voice behind Jim Hughson. Hughson left TSN and from the 1994–95 season to the 1997–98 season (when the network lost national NHL rights) Romanuk was the network's lead NHL play-by-play announcer. From 1998 to 2001 he was the English-language television voice of the Montreal Canadiens' regional broadcasts on TSN.

He was best known in Canada for his play-by-play work of international hockey on TSN, where he called virtually every major IIHF tournament from 1990 until he left the network in early 2001. He covered the NHL Entry Draft from 1987 to '93 and 1997 as a reporter, and from 1994 to '96 and 1998 as a co-host. He also co-hosted the program Baseball Tonight.

In November 1992, while covering the Vanier Cup with TSN as a sideline reporter, he was literally picked up and carried around the field in good-natured celebration by Queen's fans after the game had ended, shortly after interviewing MVP Brad Elberg.  He has not covered a Vanier Cup since then.

Romanuk has also shared a production credit on CHL Sunday Night on TSN and also on Rogers Sportsnet's presentation of the Spengler Cup hockey tournament. He has also worked at six Olympic Games (Sydney, Salt Lake City, Athens, Beijing, Vancouver and London), covering a variety of sports for CBC, TSN and CTV.

The Team 1050
In spring 2001, Romanuk left TSN after fourteen years at the network, accepting the offer of hosting a morning drive show on The Team 1050, newly re-branded AM station in Toronto. In a later interview, Romanuk cited the fact that the job didn't entail regular travel as well as CHUM's superior financial offer to his TSN compensation as two reasons he decided to leave his established post at TSN. Previously operating for decades as 1050 CHUM in the oldies format, the struggling station looked to turn its financial fortunes around with an all-sports format. Simultaneously, the station's corporate owner CHUM Limited launched The Team Radio Network, an ambitious grouping of sports format AM radio stations throughout Canada.

Romanuk wasn't the only prominent Toronto-based sportscaster on board for the launch of The Team 1050; CHUM Ltd. also brought in Mike Richards to be Romanuk's co-host in the morning while further managing a bit of a coup by luring one of TSN's most prominent personalities Jim Van Horne away from television and pairing him in the afternoon drive slot with The Globe and Mails sports writer Stephen Brunt who had prior been appearing as pundit and guest host on Bob McCown's Prime Time Sports, the established afternoon drive show the newly assembled Team 1050 afternoon duo were now trying to compete with.

Romanuk's morning show with Mike Richards as well as the entire station turned out to be short-lived, however, getting dismantled in late summer 2002 due to poor ratings as they were unable to attract any of the audience from The Fan 590, the legacy sports AM station in town.

2002—2005
After the Team 1050 job went away, Romanuk began freelancing again, doing hosting work for Leafs TV among other gigs.

Owing to his friendship and past business collaboration with the Toronto Argonauts president and CEO Keith Pelley, Romanuk got hired to call radio play-by-play alongside colour commentator Pete Martin for the Argonauts games during the 2004 season. As Romanuk left after only a season, the radio play-by-play job got taken over by Mike Hogan.

In fall 2004, Romanuk got hired by the Telemedia-owned Fan 590 AM station management—consisting of John Shannon and Nelson Millman—as the radio play-by-play voice of the Toronto Raptors broadcasts alongside colour commentator Paul Jones. Romanuk ended up completing only the 2004–05 season before quitting.

Move to England

In spring 2005, Romanuk quit his Raptors radio play-by-play job at The Fan 590 and moved to London, England, following his wife who took an executive job at The Coca-Cola Company's European division based in the city. Moving to London, Romanuk had nothing lined up professionally, initially just hoping to continue a career in sports broadcasting.

Settling in the Battersea area of London, Romanuk found work as a freelance sportscaster, performing various one-off jobs such as calling different sports (including hockey) on Eurosport. In the lead-up to the 2007 Asian Indoor Games in Macau, China, Romanuk got hired by a contract publishing company to edit a magazine for the games, a full-time job that had him commuting between London and Macau for about six months.

He additionally freelanced on the Canadian networks CBC, CTV, TSN, and Sportsnet coverage (either individual or consortium) of various international sporting events such as play-by-play announcing of triathlon and weightlifting at the 2012 Summer Olympics in London. Other such events included IIHF World Championships, Spengler Cups, and the 2010 FIFA World Cup.

He also did voice-over work for the International Ice Hockey Federation, did play-by-play commentary for the Champions Hockey League in 2008–09, and emceed the 2012 Hockey Forum in Barcelona and the draw of the re-launched CHL in 2014 in Minsk.

By the early 2010s, Romanuk and his wife moved to West London while she also switched from a marketing executive job at Coca-Cola to one with L'Oréal.

In 2014, the couple decided to move back to Toronto as Romanuk accepted an offer from Hockey Night in Canada.

Return to Canada
In November 2013, Rogers Media's $5.2 billion, twelve-year deal with the NHL for the national and regional broadcasting rights in Canada got announced. Approached by Rogers Media sports executives Keith Pelley and Scott Moore about being part of the broadcast team, Romanuk accepted and, after signing in June 2014 followed by arranging a move back to Canada in September 2014, re-joined Sportsnet as a play-by-play announcer for its national NHL coverage. He thus further became one of the new Hockey Night in Canada'' voices and personalities, a group that included new studio host George Stroumboulopoulos whose hiring received plenty of Canadian press coverage. Alongside analyst Greg Millen, Romanuk additionally became part of the regional Toronto Maple Leafs television package airing on Sportsnet Ontario.

In 2015, Romanuk was assigned to his first conference final. Until 2018, he was the number two play-by-play announcer for Rogers' NHL coverage (behind Jim Hughson). However, he did not call a single 2016 NHL conference final game for unknown reasons (Jim Hughson called that year's Eastern Conference Final while Bob Cole called that year's Western Conference Final). In 2017, he called his second conference final.
He would go on to call three conference finals in four years.

In August 2018, Romanuk left Rogers NHL to pursue other challenges.

Other work
He has also produced corporate films and television commercials. His most notable writing work is a series of children's books – Hockey Superstars – for Scholastic Publishing, Canada. He has written many newspaper and magazine articles and continues to create projects for various clients. in 2010 he produced a "Behind The Scenes" documentary of Canadian recording artist Tomi Swick's record, which was recorded in London.

References

External links

1961 births
Association football commentators
Canadian colour commentators
Canadian expatriate ice hockey people
Canadian expatriate sportspeople in England
Canadian Football League announcers
Canadian people of Ukrainian descent
Canadian sports journalists
Canadian radio sportscasters
Canadian television sportscasters
Living people
Major League Baseball broadcasters
Montreal Canadiens announcers
National Basketball Association broadcasters
National Hockey League broadcasters
Olympic Games broadcasters
People from Oshawa
Toronto Metropolitan University alumni
Toronto Argonauts personnel
Toronto Raptors announcers
St. Louis Blues announcers